Grignasco is a comune (municipality) in the Province of Novara in the Italian region Piedmont, located about  northeast of Turin and about  northwest of Novara.

Grignasco borders the following municipalities: Boca, Borgosesia, Prato Sesia, Serravalle Sesia, and Valduggia.

Twin towns — sister cities
Grignasco is twinned with:

  Pont-Sainte-Maxence, France, since 1992

References

External links
 Official website

Cities and towns in Piedmont